José de Aquino Pereira (April 22, 1920 – November 17, 2011) was a Brazilian prelate of the Roman Catholic Church.

Pereira was born in Brazil and ordained a priest on December 3, 1944 from the Diocese of São Carlos do Pinhal. Pereira was appointed Bishop of the Diocese of Dourados on January 23, 1958 and was ordained bishop on April 13, 1958. His next appointment would be to the Diocese of Presidente Prudente on March 26, 1960.  Pereira last appointment would be to the Diocese of São José do Rio Preto on May 6, 1968, where he served until his retirement on February 26, 1997.

References

External links
Catholic-Hierarchy

20th-century Roman Catholic bishops in Brazil
Participants in the Second Vatican Council
1920 births
2011 deaths
Roman Catholic bishops of Dourados
Roman Catholic bishops of Presidente Prudente
Roman Catholic bishops of São José do Rio Preto